This is the list of the main first-class rugby union teams in New Zealand, including national teams, Super Rugby teams, National Provincial Championship teams, and Heartland Championship teams. The list does not include women's teams, local club or school teams, inactive teams, such as the North and South Island teams, or non-geographic representative teams, such as the New Zealand Universities, Marist, or Barbarians sides.

National representative teams 
 New Zealand
 Junior All Blacks
 New Zealand Maori
 All Blacks Sevens
 New Zealand U-20
 The Heartland XV
 New Zealand Schools

Super Rugby teams 
 
 
 Crusaders
 Highlanders

North Island unions

South Island unions

See also 
 List of defunct New Zealand rugby union teams
Heartland Rugby website